Point24 is a free daily newspaper in Luxembourg.

History and profile
Point24 was established in 2007. It is published by Saint-Paul Luxembourg.  Originally published exclusively in French, like the rival freesheet L'essentiel, Point24 then was divided, with a German front page and a French one, opposite to each other. Later on the 2 versions were divided into 2 separate newspapers, in a smaller format, magazine like. Finally in February 2011 a Portuguese version of the newspaper, with editions on Thursdays and Tuesdays, was launched.

References

External links
  Point24 official website

Daily newspapers published in Luxembourg
Publications established in 2007
French-language newspapers published in Luxembourg
German-language newspapers published in Luxembourg
2007 establishments in Luxembourg
Free daily newspapers
Portuguese-language newspapers